Proctoporus pachyurus, Tschudi's lightbulb lizard, is a species of lizard in the family Gymnophthalmidae. It is endemic to Peru.

References

Proctoporus
Reptiles of Peru
Endemic fauna of Peru
Reptiles described in 1845
Taxa named by Johann Jakob von Tschudi